The people of Chad speak more than 100 different languages and divide themselves into many ethnic groups. However, language and ethnicity are not the same. Moreover, neither element can be tied to a particular physical type.

Although the possession of a common language shows that its speakers have lived together and have a common history, peoples also change languages. This is particularly so in Chad, where the openness of the terrain, marginal rainfall, frequent drought and famine, and low population densities have encouraged physical and linguistic mobility. Slave raids among non-Muslim peoples, internal slave trade, and exports of captives northward from the ninth to the twentieth centuries also have resulted in language changes.

Anthropologists view ethnicity as being more than genetics. Like language, ethnicity implies a shared heritage, partly economic, where people of the same ethnic group may share a livelihood, and partly social, taking the form of shared ways of doing things and organizing relations among individuals and groups. Ethnicity also involves a cultural component made up of shared values and a common worldview. Like language, ethnicity is not immutable. Shared ways of doing things change over time and alter a group's perception of its own identity.

Not only do the social aspects of ethnic identity change but the biological composition (or gene pool) also may change over time. Although most ethnic groups emphasize intermarriage, people are often proscribed from seeking partners among close relatives—a prohibition that promotes biological variation. In all groups, the departure of some individuals or groups and the integration of others also changes the biological component.

The Chadian government has avoided official recognition of ethnicity. With the exception of a few surveys conducted shortly after independence, little data were available on this important aspect of Chadian society. Nonetheless, ethnic identity was a significant component of life in Chad.

The peoples of Chad carry significant ancestry from Eastern, Central, Western, and Northern Africa.

Chad's languages fall into ten major groups, each of which belongs to either the
Nilo-Saharan, Afro-Asiatic, or Niger–Congo language family. These represent three of the four major language families in Africa; only the Khoisan languages of southern Africa are not represented. The presence of such different languages suggests that the Lake Chad Basin may have been an important point of dispersal in ancient times.

Population

The proportion of children below the age of 15 in 2010 was 45.4%, 51.7% was between 15 and 65 years of age, while 2.9% was 65 years or the country is projected to have a population of 34 millions peoples in 2050 and 61 millions peoples in 2100
.

Population by Sex and Age Group (Census 20.V.2009):

Vital statistics
Registration of vital events is in Chad not complete. The Population Departement of the United Nations prepared the following estimates.

Source: UN DESA, World Population Prospects, 2022

Fertility and births
Total Fertility Rate (TFR) (Wanted Fertility Rate) and Crude Birth Rate (CBR):

Fertility data as of 2014-2015 (DHS Program):

Religions 

The separation of religion from social structure in Chad represents a false dichotomy, for they are perceived as two sides of the same coin. Three religious traditions coexist in Chad- classical African religions, Islam, and Christianity. None is monolithic. The first tradition includes a variety of ancestor and/or place-oriented religions whose expression is highly specific. Islam, although characterized by an orthodox set of beliefs and observances, also is expressed in diverse ways. Christianity arrived in Chad much more recently with the arrival of Europeans. Its followers are divided into Roman Catholics and Protestants (including several denominations); as with Chadian Islam, Chadian Christianity retains aspects of pre-Christian religious belief.

The number of followers of each tradition in Chad is unknown. Estimates made in 1962 suggested that 35 percent of Chadians practiced classical African religions, 55 percent were Muslims, and 10 percent were Christians. In the 1970s and 1980s, this distribution undoubtedly changed. Observers report that Islam has spread among the Hajerai and among other non-Muslim populations of the Saharan and sahelian zones. However, the proportion of Muslims may have fallen because the birthrate among the followers of traditional religions and Christians in southern Chad is thought to be higher than that among Muslims. In addition, the upheavals since the mid-1970s have resulted in the departure of some missionaries; whether or not Chadian Christians have been numerous enough and organized enough to have attracted more converts since that time is unknown.

Other demographic statistics 

Demographic statistics according to the World Population Review in 2022.

One birth every 45 seconds	
One death every 3 minutes	
One net migrant every 1440 minutes	
Net gain of one person every 1 minutes

The following demographic statistics are from the CIA World Factbook.

Population
17,963,211 (2022 est.)
15,833,116 (July 2018 est.)
12,075,985 (2017 est.)

Religions
Muslim 52.1%, Protestant 23.9%, Roman Catholic 20%, animist 0.3%, other Christian 0.2%, none 2.8%, unspecified 0.7% (2014-15 est.)

Age structure

0-14 years: 47.43% (male 4,050,505/female 3,954,413)
15-24 years: 19.77% (male 1,676,495/female 1,660,417)
25-54 years: 27.14% (male 2,208,181/female 2,371,490)
55-64 years: 3.24% (male 239,634/female 306,477)
65 years and over: 2.43% (2020 est.) (male 176,658/female 233,087)

0-14 years: 48.12% (male 3,856,001 /female 3,763,622)
15-24 years: 19.27% (male 1,532,687 /female 1,518,940)
25-54 years: 26.95% (male 2,044,795 /female 2,222,751)
55-64 years: 3.25% (male 228,930 /female 286,379)
65 years and over: 2.39% (male 164,257 /female 214,754) (2018 est.)

Median age
total: 16.1 years. Country comparison to the world: 223rd
male: 15.6 years
female: 16.5 years (2020 est.)

total: 15.8 years. Country comparison to the world: 226th
male: 15.3 years 
female: 16.3 years (2018 est.)

Total: 17.8 years
Male: 16.8 years
Female: 18.8 years (2017 est.)

Population growth rate
3.09% (2022 est.) Country comparison to the world: 10th
3.23% (2018 est.) Country comparison to the world: 5th

Birth rate
40.45 births/1,000 population (2022 est.) Country comparison to the world: 6th
43 births/1,000 population (2018 est.) Country comparison to the world: 4th

Death rate
9.45 deaths/1,000 population (2022 est.) Country comparison to the world: 49th
10.5 deaths/1,000 population (2018 est.) Country comparison to the world: 26th

Net migration rate
-0.13 migrant(s)/1,000 population (2022 est.) Country comparison to the world: 105th
-3.2 migrant(s)/1,000 population (2017 est.) Country comparison to the world: 176th

Total fertility rate
5.46 children born/woman (2022 est.) Country comparison to the world: 5th
5.9 children born/woman (2018 est.) Country comparison to the world: 4th

Mother's mean age at first birth
18.1 years (2014/15 est.)
note: median age at first birth among women 25-49

Dependency ratios
total dependency ratio: 100.2 (2015 est.)
youth dependency ratio: 95.2 (2015 est.)
elderly dependency ratio: 4.9 (2015 est.)
potential support ratio: 20.3 (2015 est.)

Contraceptive prevalence rate
8.1% (2019)
5.7% (2014/15)

Urbanization
urban population: 24.1% of total population (2022)
rate of urbanization: 4.1% annual rate of change (2020-25 est.)

urban population: 23.1% of total population (2018)
rate of urbanization: 3.88% annual rate of change (2015-20 est.)

Sex ratio
At birth: 1.04 male(s)/female
Under 15 years: 1.01 male(s)/female
15–64 years: 0.92 male(s)/female
65 years and over: 0.66 male(s)/female
Total population: 0.96 male(s)/female (2006 est.)

Life expectancy at birth
total population: 59.15 years. Country comparison to the world: 222nd
male: 57.32 years
female: 61.06 years (2022 est.)

total population: 57.5 years (2018 est.) Country comparison to the world: 214th
male: 55.7 years (2018 est.)
female: 59.3 years (2018 est.)

Total population: 50.6 years
Male: 49.4 years
Female: 51.9 years (2017 est.)

HIV/AIDS
Adult prevalence rate: 1.3% (2017 est.)
People living with HIV/AIDS: 110,000(2017 est.)
Deaths: 3,100 (2017 est.)

Children under the age of 5 years underweight
28.8% (2015)

Major infectious diseases
degree of risk: very high (2020)
food or waterborne diseases: bacterial and protozoal diarrhea, hepatitis A and E, and typhoid fever
vectorborne diseases: malaria and dengue fever
water contact diseases: schistosomiasis
animal contact diseases: rabies
respiratory diseases: meningococcal meningitis

note: on 21 March 2022, the US Centers for Disease Control and Prevention (CDC) issued a Travel Alert for polio in Africa; Chad is currently considered a high risk to travelers for circulating vaccine-derived polioviruses (cVDPV); vaccine-derived poliovirus (VDPV) is a strain of the weakened poliovirus that was initially included in oral polio vaccine (OPV) and that has changed over time and behaves more like the wild or naturally occurring virus; this means it can be spread more easily to people who are unvaccinated against polio and who come in contact with the stool or respiratory secretions, such as from a sneeze, of an “infected” person who received oral polio vaccine; the CDC recommends that before any international travel, anyone unvaccinated, incompletely vaccinated, or with an unknown polio vaccination status should complete the routine polio vaccine series; before travel to any high-risk destination, CDC recommends that adults who previously completed the full, routine polio vaccine series receive a single, lifetime booster dose of polio vaccine

Child marriage
women married by age 15: 24.2% (2019)
women married by age 18: 60.6% (2019)
men married by age 18: 8.1% (2019 est.)

Nationality
Noun: Chadian(s)
Adjective: Chadian

Ethnic groups

The peoples of Chad carry significant ancestry from Eastern, Central, Western, and Northern Africa. 
200 distinct groups
In the north and center: Arabs, Tubu (Daza, Teda), Zaghawa, Kanembu, Wadai, Baguirmi, Hadjarai, Fulani, Kotoko, Hausa, Bulala, and Maba, most of whom are Muslim
In the south: Sara (Ngambaye, Mbaye, Goulaye), Mundang, Mussei, Massa, most of whom are Christian or animist

About 5,000 French citizens live in Chad.

Religions
Islam 51.8% 
Roman Catholic 20.3%
Protestant 23.5%
Animist 0.6%
Other Christians 0.3%
Unknown 0.6%
None 2.9%

Languages

Arabic (official), French (official), Sara (in south), more than 120 different languages and dialects

Literacy
Definition: age 15 and over can read and write French or Arabic
total population: 22.3% (2016 est.)
male: 31.3% (2016 est.)
female: 14% (2016 est.)

School life expectancy (primary to tertiary education)
total: 7 years
male: 9 years
female: 6 years (2015)

total: 8 years (2014)
male: 9 years (2014)
female: 6 years (2014)

Notes

References

Attribution:

 
Society of Chad